The 2006 Masters (officially the 2006 SAGA Insurance Masters) was a professional non-ranking snooker tournament that took place from 15 to 22 January 2006 at the Wembley Conference Centre in London, England. It was the 32nd edition of the tournament, and the last time that the tournament was held at this venue. The tournament was part of the 2005/2006 season.

John Higgins won his 2nd Masters title by defeating defending champion Ronnie O'Sullivan 10–9 in a reverse of last year's final.

Field
Defending champion Ronnie O'Sullivan was the number 1 seed with World Champion Shaun Murphy seeded 2. Places were allocated to the leading players in the world rankings. With Murphy having a ranking of 21, Ian McCulloch, ranked 16, was not an automatic invitation. Players seeded 15 and 16 played in the wild-card round against the winner of the qualifying event, Stuart Bingham (ranked 37), and McCulloch, who was the wild-card selection. Stuart Bingham and Ian McCulloch were making their debuts in the Masters.

Prize fund
The breakdown of prize money for this year is shown below:

Qualifying stage
Winner: £2,000
Runner-up: £680
Semi-final: £250
Quarter-final: £105
Total: £3,600

Televised stage

Winner: £125,000
Runner Up: £60,000
Semi-final: £30,000
Quarter-final: £15,000
Last 16: £10,000
Last 18 (seeded): £10,000
Last 18 (wild-cards): £2,000

Highest break: £10,000
Maximum break: £25,000

Wild-card round

In the preliminary "wild-card round", the two wild-card players were drawn against the players seeded 15th and 16th:

Main draw

Final

Qualifying
The 2005 Masters Qualifying Event was  held between 20 and 23 November 2005 at Pontin's in Prestatyn, Wales. The winner who qualified for the tournament, was Stuart Bingham.

Century breaks

Televised stage centuries
Total: 11
 139, 138, 100  Ronnie O'Sullivan
 138, 100  Peter Ebdon
 116, 102  Graeme Dott
 115, 101  Shaun Murphy
 110  John Higgins
 101  Stephen Lee

Qualifying stage centuries 

 147, 114, 109, 101  Stuart Bingham
 140, 106, 100  Fergal O'Brien
 132, 120, 116, 116  Ding Junhui
 132, 106, 101  Barry Hawkins
 130, 100  Ryan Day
 127, 105  Judd Trump
 127  Jamie Cope
 125, 117, 114, 111  Robin Hull

 125, 102, 101  Joe Swail
 122  Michael Judge
 120  Ricky Walden
 114  Patrick Wallace
 112, 100  Alfie Burden
 111  James Tatton
 110  Lee Spick
 107  Ali Carter

References

Masters (snooker)
Masters
Masters (snooker)
Masters (snooker)